A Meronothite was the name given to a biblical person from Meronoth. There are only two mentions of them in the bible: Jehdeiah and Jadon. Although Nehemiah 3:7 seems to suggest that Meronoth was close to Gibeon and Mizpah, Mizpah is a doubtful reading. Grollenberg identified it as Beitûniyeh, NW of Gibeon, following earlier studies.

See also 
 Mizpah
 Gibeon
 Meronoth

References 

Hebrew Bible places